The Committee on World Food Security (CFS) was established in 1974 as an intergovernmental body to serve as a forum in the United Nations System for review and follow-up of policies concerning world food security, including any and all production, physical, and economic access to food.

The committee's tasks are to:
 Coordinate a global approach to food security
 Promote policy convergence
 Support and advise countries and regions
 Coordinate at national and regional levels
 Promote accountability and share best practices
 Develop a global strategic framework for food security and nutrition

Structure

The CFS Bureau and Advisory Group

The Bureau is the executive arm of the CFS .  It is made up of a Chairperson and twelve member countries. The current Chairperson is Thanawat Tiensin of the Kingdom of Thailand. The Advisory group is made up of representatives from the five different categories of CFS Participants.  These are:

1	UN agencies and other UN bodies;
2	Civil society and non-governmental organizations particularly organizations representing smallholder family farmers, fisherfolks, herders, landless, urban poor, agricultural and food workers, women, youth, consumers and indigenous people;
3	International agricultural research institutions;
4	International and regional financial institutions such as the World Bank, the International Monetary Fund, regional development banks and the World Trade Organization;
5	Private sector associations and philanthropic foundations.

Plenary

The Plenary session is held annually and is the central body for decision-taking, debate, coordination, lesson-learning and convergence by all stakeholders at a global level on food security issues.

The High Level Panel of Experts on Food Security and Nutrion

The High Level Panel of Experts on Food Security and Nutrition (HLPE-FSN) is the United Nations body for assessing the science related to world food security and nutrition. 

It was established in 2010 as the science-policy interface of the UN Committee on World Food Security (CFS) and aims to improve the robustness of policy making by providing independent, evidence-based analysis and advice at the request of CFS.

The HLPE-FSN has two components. The first is a steering committee made up of internationally recognized experts in a variety of food security and nutrition-related fields. The second is a roster of experts which is used to build teams that act on a project-specific basis to analyze and report on issues related to food security and nutrition.

The goal of the HLPE-FSN is to ensure the regular inclusion of advice based on scientific evidence and knowledge. As directed by the CFS Plenary and Bureau, the HLPE-FSN will assess and analyze the current state of food security and nutrition and its underlying causes. It will also provide scientific and knowledge-based analysis and advice on policy-relevant issues and identify emerging trends. It will also help prioritize future actions and focus attention on key focal areas.

The HLPE-FSN working processes ensure legitimacy among stakeholders and a high degree of scientific quality: they involve broad stakeholder consultations and the incorporation of different forms of knowledge and expertise, as well as a rigorous scientific peer-review process.

Until 2022 the HLPE-FSN has published 17 reports:
 Price volatility and food security (2011)
 Land tenure and international investments in agriculture (2011)
 Food security and climate change (2012)
 Social protection for food security (2012)
 Biofuels and food security (2013)
 Investing in smallholder agriculture for food security (2013)
 Sustainable fisheries and aquaculture for food security and nutrition (2014)
 Food losses and waste in the context of sustainable food systems (2014)
 Water for food security and nutrition (2015)
 Sustainable agricultural development for food security and nutrition: what roles for livestock? (2016)
 Sustainable forestry for food security and nutrition (2017)
 Nutrition and food systems (2017)
 Multi-stakeholder partnerships to finance and improve food security and nutrition in the framework of the 2030 Agenda (2018)
 Agroecological and other innovative approaches for sustainable agriculture and food systems that enhance food security and nutrition (2019)
 Food security and nutrition: building a global narrative towards 2030 (2020)
 Promoting youth engagement and employment in agriculture and food systems (2021)
 Data collection and analysis tools for food security and nutrition: towards enhancing effective, inclusive, evidence-informed, decision making (2022)

Committee members 

Chairperson of the HLPE-FSN Steering Committee, Mr Bernard Lehmann (Switzerland)

Vice-Chairperson of the HLPE-FSN Steering Committee, Ms. Jennifer Clapp (Canada)

Steering Committee members: Ms Olanike Adeyemo (Nigeria); Ms Barbara Burlingame (New-Zealand); Mr Ruben Echeverría (Uruguay); Ms Hilal Elver (Turkey); Mr William Moseley (United States of America); Ms Nitya Rao (India); Ms Elisabetta Recine (Brazil); Mr José María Sumpsi Viñas (Spain); Ms Akiko Suwa-Eisenmann (Japan); Mr Stefan Tangermann (Germany); Ms Shakuntala Thilsted (Trinidad and Tobago); Mr Patrick Webb (United States of America); Mr Iain Wright (United Kingdom).

The Secretariat

The CFS has a permanent Secretariat located in the Food and Agriculture Organization of the United Nations (FAO), headquartered in Rome, Italy, which includes members from the World Food Programme (WFP) and the International Fund for Agricultural Development (IFAD).  Its task is to support the Plenary, the Bureau and Advisory Group and the HLPE-FSN in their work.

External links
 Official website
 Official HLPE-FSN website
 Online Consultation on the CFS Global Strategic Framework
 Knowledge for policy - European Commission
 Vincent Gitz, Alexandre Meybeck. The establishment of the High Level Panel of Experts on food security and nutrition (HLPE). Shared, independent and comprehensive knowledge for international policy coherence in food security and nutrition. 2011. ffhal-00866427f
 Why reinvent the wheel on food security and nutrition? - Devex 

Committees
Food security
Organizations established in 1974